YouTube Music is a music streaming service developed by YouTube, a subsidiary of Google. It provides a tailored interface for the service, oriented towards music streaming, allowing users to browse through songs and music videos on YouTube based on genres, playlists, and recommendations. 

The service also offers a premium tier, which enables ad-free playback, audio-only background playback, and downloading songs for offline playback. These subscription benefits are also offered to subscribers of YouTube Premium. The service superseded Google Play Music as Google's main brand for music streaming on December 1, 2020.

History
The YouTube Music app was unveiled in October 2015 and released the following month; its release came alongside the unveiling of YouTube Premium (originally called YouTube Red), a larger subscription service that covers the entirety of the YouTube platform, including the Music app. Although redundant to Google's existing Google Play Music All Access subscription service, the app is designed for users who primarily consume music through YouTube.

On May 17, 2018, YouTube announced a new version of the YouTube Music service, including a web-based desktop player and redesigned mobile app, more dynamic recommendations based on various factors, and the use of Google artificial intelligence technology to search songs based on lyrics and descriptions. In addition, YouTube Music became a separate subscription service (positioned as a more direct competitor to Apple Music and Spotify), offering ad-free and background/audio-only streaming, and downloading for offline playback, for music content on YouTube. The service's benefits will continue to be available as part of the existing YouTube Premium (formerly YouTube Red) service and to Google Play Music All Access subscribers. The YouTube Music subscription is priced in line with its competitors at US$9.99 per-month; the price of YouTube Premium was concurrently increased to $11.99 for new subscribers.

In 2018, YouTube Music reached multiple sponsorship agreements with Dick Clark Productions to serve as a partner for its television specials Dick Clark's New Year's Rockin' Eve and the American Music Awards.

YouTube Music became available on Google Assistant smart speakers (including Google Nest smart speakers) on April 18, 2019, with feature-limited ad-supported playback available for non-subscribers in only a limited number of countries.

Features
The availability of music includes many of the releases from mainstream artists and extends to any video categorized as music on the YouTube service.  

YouTube Music initially operated in parallel with Google Play Music, but the latter was shut down in December 2020. Product manager Elias Roman stated in 2018 that they aimed to reach feature parity with Google Play Music before migrating users to it, but as of 2021 this has not been achieved.

In September 2019, YouTube Music replaced Google Play Music in the core Google Mobile Services bundle distributed on new Android devices. In May 2020, an update was released to allow imports from Google Play Music, including purchased music, playlists, cloud libraries, and recommendations.  The service still contains regressions over Google Play Music, including no online music store functionality (cannot purchase songs), and a YouTube Music Premium subscription being required in order to cast cloud library speakers to Google Nest smart speakers. Google stated that they planned to address this and other "gaps" in features between the services before Play Music is shut down. However, at the time of the shutdown, most feature gaps had not been addressed.

A "pre-save" feature for upcoming releases was added in May 2020.

In February 2023, YouTube Music launched Radio Builder, a free and from anywhere accessible web service for both paying subscribers and free users with iOS or Android devices. It allows users to create a custom radio station, selecting up to 30 artists with an option to hear only their songs or from comparable musicians. Google podcast executives Chuk and Steve McClendon also announced that podcasts would be added to the service in the near future.

Subscriptions
The free tier plays songs in its music video version where applicable. The premium tier plays official tracks of the album unless the user searches for the music video version. YouTube Music Premium and YouTube Premium subscribers are able to switch to an audio-only mode that can play in the background while the application is not in use. The free tier does not allow audio-only mode with background playback as it displays video advertisements.

YouTube Music Premium and YouTube Premium plans are available in individual and family variants. A family plan allows up to six family members from the same household to access plan features. Eligible students can obtain a discount on an individual plan.

Geographic availability

The service is available in 100 countries: American Samoa, Argentina, Aruba, Australia, Austria, Bahrain, Belarus, Belgium, Belize, Bermuda, Bolivia, Bosnia and Herzegovina, Brazil, British Virgin Islands, Bulgaria, Canada, Cayman Islands, Chile, Colombia, Costa Rica, Croatia, Cyprus, Czech Republic, Denmark, Dominican Republic, Ecuador, Egypt, El Salvador, Estonia, Finland, France, French Guiana, French Polynesia, Germany, Greece, Guadeloupe, Guam, Guatemala, Honduras, Hong Kong, Hungary, Iceland, India, Indonesia, Ireland, Israel, Italy, Japan, Kuwait, Latvia, Lebanon, Liechtenstein, Lithuania, Luxembourg, Malaysia, Malta, Mexico, the Netherlands, New Zealand, Nicaragua, Nigeria, North Macedonia, Northern Mariana Islands, Norway, Oman, Panama, Papua New Guinea, Paraguay, Peru, the Philippines, Poland, Portugal, Puerto Rico, Qatar, Romania, Russia, Rwanda, Samoa, Saudi Arabia, Serbia, Singapore, Slovakia, Slovenia, South Africa, South Korea, Spain, Sweden, Switzerland, Taiwan, Thailand, Turkey, Turks and Caicos Islands, Ukraine, the United Arab Emirates, the United Kingdom, the United States, the United States Virgin Islands, Uruguay and Venezuela.

See also
 List of most-subscribed YouTube Music artists

References

External links

Official web player

Music streaming services
YouTube
2015 software
Android (operating system) software